Heinrich Herkner (27 June 1863 – 27 May 1932) was a German economist as well as a social reformer.

Biography

Herkner was born in Liberec, Bohemia and died in Berlin, Germany.

Herkner studied with Lujo Brentano in Strasbourg. Later he taught as a professor at the universities of Freiburg (1890–1892), Karlsruhe (1892–1898), and Zürich (1898–1907), as well as the Technical University (1907–1913) and Frederick William University (1913–1932) of Berlin.

Herkner was originally a Marxist who later evolved towards realist views. Alexandra Kollontai went to Zürich to study under him, but found he had become a “revisionist” and spent much of her time at the university contesting his views.

His major work was Die Arbeiterfrage, first published in 1894.

He was a founding member of the German Society for Sociology and along with Max Weber, Ferdinand Tönnies and Georg Simmel on its first board. In 1917 he succeeded the deceased Gustav Schmoller as the President of the Verein für Socialpolitik, a position he held until 1929.

Works 
 Die oberelsässische Baumwollenindustrie und ihre Arbeiter. Auf Grund der Thatsachen dargestellt, 1887
 Die soziale Reform als Gebot des wirtschaftlichen Fortschritts, 1891
 Die Arbeiterfrage, 1894
 Der Kampf um das sittliche Werturteil in der Nationalökonomie, in: Schmollers Jb. f. Gesetzgebung, Verw. u. Volkswirtschaft im Dt. Reiche 36 (1912), 515-555
 Krieg und Volkswirtschaft, 1915
 Deutschland und Deutsch-Österreich, 1919
 Liberalismus und Nationalismus 1848-1890, 1930

References

Further reading 
 Jürgen Backhaus and Johannes Hanel (1994). "Die Nachfolge: Ein Versuch über Heinrich Herkner, den Volkswirt : mit einer Bibliographie und einem porträt Herkners". Marburg: Metropolis. 

 Eckhard Hansen, Florian Tennstedt (Hrsg.) u. a.: Biographisches Lexikon zur Geschichte der deutschen Sozialpolitik 1871 bis 1945. Band 1: Sozialpolitiker im Deutschen Kaiserreich 1871 bis 1918. Kassel University Press, Kassel 2010, S. 69 f. (Online, PDF; 2,2 MB).

External links
 ÖSTERREICHISCHES BIOGRAPHISCHES LEXIKON 1815–1950 
 

Writers from Liberec
German economists
1863 births
1932 deaths
Sudeten German people